Edward Franklin Bingham (August 13, 1828 – September 5, 1907) was chief justice of the Supreme Court of the District of Columbia.

Education and career

Born in West Concord (now Concord), Vermont, Bingham read law in 1850. He was in private practice in McArthur, Ohio, from 1850 to 1861, and in Columbus, Ohio, from 1861 to 1867, also working as prosecuting attorney of Vinton County, Ohio, from 1850 to 1855 and serving in the Ohio House of Representatives from 1856 to 1857. He was city solicitor for Columbus, thereafter returning to private practice in Columbus until 1873. He was a Judge of the Court of Common Pleas for the Fifth Judicial District in Columbus from 1873 to 1888. Bingham was an unsuccessful Democratic nominee for judge of the Supreme Court of Ohio in 1881.

Federal judicial service

Bingham received a recess appointment from President Grover Cleveland on April 22, 1887, to the Chief Justice seat on the Supreme Court of the District of Columbia (now the United States District Court for the District of Columbia) vacated by Chief Justice David Kellogg Cartter. He was nominated to the same position by President Cleveland on December 20, 1887. He was confirmed by the United States Senate on January 23, 1888, and received his commission the same day. His service terminated on April 30, 1903, due to his retirement.

Later career and death

Following his retirement from the federal bench, Bingham resumed private practice in Columbus from 1903 to 1907. He died on September 5, 1907, in Union, West Virginia.

References

Sources
 

1828 births
1907 deaths
People from Concord, Vermont
Judges of the United States District Court for the District of Columbia
United States federal judges appointed by Grover Cleveland
19th-century American judges
Ohio state court judges
Democratic Party members of the Ohio House of Representatives
People from McArthur, Ohio
Lawyers from Columbus, Ohio
United States federal judges admitted to the practice of law by reading law